Hattaphon Bun An (born 5 May 1991, in Jitra, Kedah) is a Thai-Malaysian professional footballer who plays as a forward and left winger for Malaysia M3 League club Langkawi Glory United.

Club career

Kedah FA
Hattaphon was a product of Kedah FA youth system, first playing for the team in the Kedah FA U-21 team, compete in the Malaysia President Cup competition. Later he was promoted to the senior team and was playing regularly in their 2013 Malaysia Premier League season.

T-Team FC
Hattaphon joined T-Team, a club based in Kuala Terengganu, for the 2014 Malaysia Super League season. At T-Team, he was converted to a winger due to shortage of players in that position, from his normal position as a striker.

Kuala Lumpur FA
In January 2015, Hattaphon joined Kuala Lumpur FA for 2015 Malaysia Premier League season after a season with Kuala Terengganu based club, T-Team. Hattaphon was later released during mid season due to injury.

Kelantan FA
In January 2016, Hattaphon been seen playing for Kelantan FA in a pre season matches. He scored one goal in a friendly match against UiTM. On 20 January 2016, he later was confirmed as part of the senior team. On 27 January 2017, he made his debut playing against PKNS F.C. in Shah Alam Stadium when he replaced Indra Putra in the 89th minute, match end up Kelantan won 3–1.

Career Statistic

Club statistics

References

External links
 Profile at Goal.com
 

1991 births
Malaysian people of Thai descent
Malaysian footballers
People from Kedah
Living people
Kedah Darul Aman F.C. players
Kelantan FA players
Malaysia Super League players
Association football forwards
Association football wingers